The , variously known as Kagoshima Tropical Botanical Garden, Kagoshima Tropical Vegetation Park, or Kagoshima Prefecture Botanical Gardens, was a botanical garden located at 1-7-15 Yojiro, Kagoshima, Kagoshima, Japan. 

The garden was founded in 1971, and contained tropical plants from around the world, including palms, orchids, and cacti.

It was closed in 2006.

See also 
 List of botanical gardens in Japan

References 

 BGCI entry
 Synapse description
 Birkdale International description

Botanical gardens in Japan
Kagoshima
Gardens in Kagoshima Prefecture